Albia Community High School is a Monroe County high school in Albia, Iowa, United States. It is the only high school in the Albia Community School District. The mascots are the Blue Demons and Lady Dees.

Athletics
The Blue Demons and Lady Dees are members of the South Central Conference, and participate in the following sports:
Football
Cross Country
Volleyball
Basketball
Wrestling
Golf
Soccer
Tennis
Track and Field
Baseball
Softball

References

Albia, Iowa
Public high schools in Iowa